is a Japanese manga written and illustrated by Kouko Agawa. It is licensed in North America by Digital Manga Publishing, which released the manga through its June imprint, on June 10, 2008.

Reception
Danielle Van Gorder felt the plot was convoluted with "by-the-book plot twists", but that something about the characters made the book "more interesting" than Van Gorder otherwise felt it should have been.  She felt the melodrama of the work pushed it into becoming "almost a strange absurdist comedy". Rachel Bentham, writing for Active Anime, praised the "distinct" character designs, saying that this reflected the characters' personalities, and noted that the plot was a "full-bodied love triangle". Leroy Douresseaux felt the artwork gave the manga a "Film Noir" feel, and praised the expressiveness which the art gave the characters.

References

External links
 

Drama anime and manga
2006 manga
Yaoi anime and manga
Digital Manga Publishing titles